Aquimarina muelleri  is a Gram-negative, strictly aerobic, heterotrophic and motile bacterium from the genus of Aquimarina which has been isolated from sea-water from the Amur Bay.

References

External links
Type strain of Aquimarina muelleri at BacDive -  the Bacterial Diversity Metadatabase	

Flavobacteria
Bacteria described in 2005